"A Peace Plan for a Safer America" is a gun control plan proposed by March for Our Lives. The plan was unveiled in August 2019.

Plan
The plan has six points. More than 40 people worked on the plan, collaborating online, over phone, and at a meeting in Houston in July 2019.

Endorsements
Beto O'Rourke was the first 2020 presidential candidate to endorse the plan.

References

External links

 A Peace Plan for a Safer America at March for Our Lives

2019 in American politics
Firearm safety
Gun politics in the United States